Edwardsport is a town in Vigo Township, Knox County, Indiana, United States. The population was 303 at the 2010 census. It was founded in 1832 and named after Edward Wilkins, a founding father.

History
Alfred Simonson House was added to the National Register of Historic Places in 2009.

Geography
Edwardsport is located at  (38.811322, -87.251670).

Climate
The climate in this area is characterized by hot, humid summers and generally mild to cool winters.  According to the Köppen Climate Classification system, Edwardsport has a humid subtropical climate, abbreviated "Cfa" on climate maps.

Demographics

2010 census
As of the census of 2010, there were 303 people, 128 households, and 87 families living in the town. The racial makeup of the town was 98.3% White, 0.3% Pacific Islander, 0.7% from other races, and 0.7% from two or more races. Hispanic or Latino of any race were 1.7% of the population.

There were 128 households, of which 25.8% had children under the age of 18 living with them, 52.3% were married couples living together, 10.2% had a female householder with no husband present, 5.5% had a male householder with no wife present, and 32.0% were non-families. 29.7% of all households were made up of individuals, and 10.9% had someone living alone who was 65 years of age or older. The average household size was 2.37 and the average family size was 2.85.

The median age in the town was 45.2 years. 19.5% of residents were under the age of 18; 6.3% were between the ages of 18 and 24; 23.5% were from 25 to 44; 35.6% were from 45 to 64; and 15.2% were 65 years of age or older. The gender makeup of the town was 50.8% male and 49.2% female.

2000 census
As of the census of 2000, there were 363 people, 151 households, and 104 families living in the town. The racial makeup of the town was 97.80% White, 0.55% African American, 0.28% Native American, and 1.38% from other races. Hispanic or Latino of any race were 1.65% of the population.

There were 151 households, out of which 31.8% had children under the age of 18 living with them, 56.3% were married couples living together, 7.9% had a female householder with no husband present, and 31.1% were non-families. 27.8% of all households were made up of individuals, and 14.6% had someone living alone who was 65 years of age or older. The average household size was 2.40 and the average family size was 2.88.

In the town, the population was spread out, with 22.9% under the age of 18, 10.5% from 18 to 24, 31.1% from 25 to 44, 24.0% from 45 to 64, and 11.6% who were 65 years of age or older. The median age was 37 years. For every 100 females, there were 100.6 males. For every 100 females age 18 and over, there were 104.4 males.

The median income for a household in the town was $26,750, and the median income for a family was $31,979. Males had a median income of $26,979 versus $17,917 for females. The per capita income for the town was $13,541. About 15.6% of families and 20.5% of the population were below the poverty line, including 38.5% of those under age 18 and 8.9% of those age 65 or over.

Power generation

The Edwardsport Power Station located to the south of the town provides energy to the region. The plant has two units totalling 160 megawatt capacity. A report by the WWF in 2005 ranked it as the second most polluting power station in the industrialized world, in terms of the level of carbon dioxide produced per unit of electricity generated.

A third IGCC unit, of 600 megawatts, is under construction. When it opens in 2011, units one and two are to be decommissioned.

See also
 https://web.archive.org/web/20130508125612/http://www.myedwardsport.com/
 List of least carbon efficient power stations

References

Communities of Southwestern Indiana
Towns in Knox County, Indiana
Towns in Indiana
1839 establishments in Indiana
Populated places established in 1839